The 2020 Italian Athletics Championships are the 110th edition of the Italian Athletics Championships and took place in Padua — instead of La Spezia as initially scheduled before the COVID-19 pandemic. 

10 running events are held later 17–18 October 2020, in Campo Scuola Atletica, Modena, for all the long-distance events (1500m and more, walking races), with the 10km (track) previously in Vittorio Veneto.

The only National Record set during these Championships was the Italian Junior record by Rachele Mori (born 2003) with 65.03 m, second at Hammer Throw, but the Championships Record of 21.99 m by Leonardo Fabbri was considered as the best mark of all the first phase.

The best performance of the second phase, called Festa dell’Endurance in Modena, was the National Best on 10 km walk (road) by Antonella Palmisano.

Champions
First title at senior level for Larissa Iapichino at the Italian championships 2020.

See also
 2020 Italian Athletics Indoor Championships

References

External links
 All results at FIDAL web site

Italian Athletics Championships
Athletics
Italian Athletics Outdoor Championships
Athletics competitions in Italy
Italian Athletics Championships, 2020